Another World is the ninth studio album by Gerry Rafferty. The album was released in 2000 on the Icon Music label to good reviews.  It was re-released in 2003 on the Hypertension label with a slightly amended track order, and with "La Fenêtre" replaced by "Keep It To Yourself", the latter track also being released a single in Europe and the UK.  Mark Knopfler of Dire Straits appears throughout the album, providing rhythm guitar and lead fills. The album was originally only available through Rafferty's website to download.

Track listing 2000 edition
All songs were written and arranged by Gerry Rafferty, except where noted.

"All Souls" – 5:20
"Land of the Chosen Few" – 5:13
"Sweet Surrender" – 4:02
"Sweet Love" – 4:27
"Whose House Is It Anyway?" (Rafferty, Julian Littman) – 4:31
"It's Better This Way" – 4:00
"Conscious Love" – 4:26
"La Fenêtre" – 3:17
"Everytime I Wake Up" – 5:52
"Xavier & Honor" – 3:10
"You Put Something Better Inside of Me" (Rafferty, Joe Egan) – 4:53
"Metanoia" – 3:24
"Children of the Sun" – 4:04
"Another World" – 10:40
Contains the hidden track "The Grinches"

Track listing 2003 edition
All songs were written and arranged by Gerry Rafferty, except where noted.

"All Souls" – 5:20
"Land of the Chosen Few" – 5:13
"Keep It To Yourself" – 5:42
"Sweet Love" – 4:27
"Whose House Is It Anyway?" (Rafferty, Julian Littman) – 4:31
"It's Better This Way" – 4:00
"Conscious Love" – 4:26
"Sweet Surrender" – 4:02
"Everytime I Wake Up" – 5:52
"Xavier & Honor" – 3:10
"You Put Something Better Inside of Me" (Rafferty, Joe Egan) – 4:53
"Metanoia" – 3:24
"Children of the Sun" – 4:04
"Another World" – 10:40
Contains the hidden track "The Grinches"

Personnel
Gerry Rafferty – vocals, acoustic guitar, synthesizer, bass guitar, keyboards, piano, Fender Rhodes
Giles Twigg – drums, percussion, programming, bass guitar, effected guitar, engineer
Mel Collins – saxophone
Arran Ahmun, Dave Suttle – percussion
Cindy Legall, Tamara Marshall, Karen Griffiths – backing vocals
Bryn Haworth – electric guitar, slide guitar
Julian Littman – electric guitar, accordion, backing vocals
Kenny Craddock – keyboards, accordion, Hammond organ
Bryn Haworth – slide guitar, mandolin
Mark Knopfler – electric guitar, lead guitar
Vic Linton - electric guitar
Mo Foster, Pino Palladino – bass guitar

References

Gerry Rafferty albums
2000 albums